Adam Ferency (born 5 October 1951) is a Polish actor. He has appeared in more than 70 films and television shows since 1976. He starred in the 1990 film Burial of a Potato, which was screened in the Un Certain Regard section at the 1991 Cannes Film Festival.

Selected filmography
 Blind Chance (1981)
 Fever (1981)
 Interrogation (1982)
 The Mother of Kings (1987)
 Burial of a Potato (1990)
 Conversation with a Cupboard Man (1993)
 With Fire and Sword (1999)
 Pornografia (2003)
 80 Million (2011)
 Battle of Warsaw 1920 (2011)
 Cold War (2018)

See also
Cinema of Poland
List of Poles

References

External links

1951 births
Living people
Polish male film actors
Male actors from Warsaw
Aleksander Zelwerowicz National Academy of Dramatic Art in Warsaw alumni
Polish male stage actors
Polish male television actors
Polish male voice actors